Guerrier (French: warrior) is a French surname that may refer to

André Guerrier (1874–?), French Olympic sailor 
Akia Guerrier (born 1998), female sprinter for the Turks and Caicos Islands 
Edith Guerrier (1870–1958), American librarian
Edmund Guerrier (1840–1921), American interpreter
Francis Guerrier (1896–1969), French aviator
John Walter Guerrier Lund (1912–2015), English phycologist
Julien Guerrier (born 1985), French golfer
Matt Guerrier (born 1978), American baseball pitcher 
Philippe Guerrier (1757–1845), President of Haïti
Prosper Guerrier de Dumast (1796–1883), French Catholic figure
Quincy Guerrier (born 1999), Canadian basketball player
Simon Guerrier (born 1976), British science fiction author and dramatist 
Vladimir Guerrier (1837–1919), Russian historian 
Wilde-Donald Guerrier (born 1989), Haitian football player
William Guerrier (1812–1858), American businessman

See also
French ship Guerrier 

French-language surnames